Jets to Brazil was an American indie rock band from Brooklyn, New York, USA. They formed in 1997 and were active until 2003.

History
Jets to Brazil was founded by Blake Schwarzenbach, the former frontman of Jawbreaker, and Jeremy Chatelain, previously the guitarist and vocalist of Handsome, when Schwarzenbach relocated to New York City after Jawbreaker's disbanding. The two began working on four-track recordings aided by drum machines until former Texas Is the Reason drummer Chris Daly joined the band, and they signed to Jade Tree Records. The origin of the band's name came from a suggestion by Daly, after seeing it on a poster in the 1961 film Breakfast at Tiffany's.

The group's first album, Orange Rhyming Dictionary, was released on Jade Tree Records in 1998 to critical and commercial success, followed by extensive touring with bands like The Promise Ring. Their second album, Four Cornered Night, was released in 2000 to mainly positive reviews. Four Cornered Night was the first album to feature new guitarist Brian Maryansky, formerly of the band The Van Pelt. With Maryansky included in the band, this allowed Schwarzenbach to also become the keyboard player for the band. In 2002, Jets to Brazil released their third and final album, Perfecting Loneliness, to positive reviews.

By the fall of 2003, less than a year after the release of Perfecting Loneliness, the band broke up for unspecified reasons.

Schwarzenbach teaches English at Hunter College in New York City and is pursuing a PhD in English Literature. In October 2008, he started a new band, The Thorns of Life, but was short-lived and broke up in August 2009. Shortly afterwards, Schwarzenbach enlisted Against Me! drummer Kevin Mahon and bassist Caroline Paquita to form Forgetters who released an album and started their own record label, Too Small To Fail Records. In 2017, Schwarzenbach reunited with Jawbreaker.

Daly reunited with Texas Is The Reason for two shows at the Irving Plaza in New York City in November 2006 and a reunion tour from 2012 to 2013.

"Sweet Avenue", the final track of Orange Rhyming Dictionary, has often been attributed to Damien Rice due to misattribution on peer-to-peer networks.

On March 25, 2019, during the Q&A portion a screening of Jawbreaker's documentary Don't Break Down, Schwarzenbach answered a fan question regarding a Jets To Brazil reunion to which he answered it may happen one day but his present main focus is on Jawbreaker.

Discography
Orange Rhyming Dictionary (1998)
Four Cornered Night (2000)
Perfecting Loneliness (2002)

References

External links
Chris' JTB Page
JTB page on Jade Tree Records website

Alternative rock groups from New York (state)
American emo musical groups
Indie rock musical groups from New York (state)
Jade Tree (record label) artists
Musical groups established in 1997
Musical groups disestablished in 2003
Musical groups from Brooklyn